Inel Tomlinson is an actor, TV personality and stand-up comedian from London, best known for being one half of Johnny and Inel, the UK's first black comedy double act. As part of Johnny and Inel, the duo are well known on Kids TV for their hit CBBC TV comedy show 'The Johnny & Inel Show' and Junior Vets on Call. In 2015, the pair joined the Fubar Radio team and took over the airwaves with their Thursday afternoon 'Live & Loud' show. After a successful year at Fubar Radio, the duo were invited to join the all-new Virgin Radio UK lineup in a prime Friday night 7pm-11pm slot.

As a voiceover artist, Tomlinson has recently brought to life the energetic fun 'Rex' in CBeebies 'Footy Pups' and has voiced Agent A Gent in the new CBBC Zig & Zag cartoon released in April 2016.

Tomlinson has also appeared on Videogame Nation and is a regular on the stand-up comedy circuit performing around the country at gigs for Jongleurs, The Glee Club and many more.

His stand-up comedy experience led him to set up Kinetic Comedy, a lively multicultural monthly event that showcases the best up and coming comedy acts interspersed with games, competitions and music.

Since 2015, Tomlinson has appeared twice in the CBBC panel show The Dog Ate My Homework. In April 2017, he appeared in a promotional video for the return of PaRappa the Rapper.

References

External links

 BBC Live Classroom Judge

Black British male comedians
Living people
Comedians from London
English stand-up comedians
English comedy writers
Black British male actors
1984 births
Twitch (service) streamers